Delay composition, also called delay charge or delay train, is a pyrotechnic composition, a sort of pyrotechnic initiator, a mixture of oxidizer and fuel that burns in a slow, constant rate that should not be significantly dependent on temperature and pressure. Delay compositions are used to introduce a  delay into the firing train, e.g. to properly sequence firing of fireworks, to delay firing of ejection charges in e.g. model rockets, or to introduce a few seconds of time between triggering a hand grenade and its explosion. Typical delay times range between several milliseconds and several seconds.

A popular delay charge is a tube of pressed black powder. The mechanical assembly prevents the outright detonation of the charge.

While delay compositions are principally similar to other fuel-oxidizer compositions, larger grain sizes and less aggressively reacting chemicals are used. Many of the compositions generate little or no gas during burning. Typical materials used are:
 Fuels: silicon, boron, manganese, tungsten, antimony, antimony trisulfide, zirconium, zirconium–nickel alloy, zinc, magnesium, etc.
 Oxidizers: lead dioxide, iron oxides, barium chromate, lead chromate, tin(IV) oxide, bismuth(III) oxide, barium sulfate (for high-temperature compositions), potassium perchlorate (usually used in small amount together with other oxidizers), etc.
 Additives to cool down the flame and slow down the reaction can be employed; inert materials or coolants like titanium dioxide, ground glass, chalk, sodium bicarbonate, etc. are common.

The burn rates are dependent on: 
 nature of fuel - fuels that release more heat burn faster
 nature of oxidizer - oxidizers that require less heat to decompose burn faster
 the composition ratio - stoichiometric mixtures burn the fastest, also slight excess of metallic fuel also increases burn rate, probably due to heat transfer
 particle sizes - smaller particles burn faster, but too small particles may lead to incomplete or interrupted burn due to too narrow heating zone
 mechanical assembly and housing - charge diameter and thermal conductivity of housing influence lateral heat losses
 ambient temperature - ideally this dependence is very low but extremely low or extremely high temperatures may have influence

Examples of some compositions are: 
 black powder with addition of inert material, e.g. chalk or sodium bicarbonate
 lead(II) oxide with silicon, burning at 1.5–2 cm/s
 red lead with silicon, burning at intermediate rate
 lead(IV) oxide with silicon, burning at 5–6 cm/s
 potassium permanganate with antimony, very slow
 Manganese Delay Composition: manganese with lead chromate and barium chromate (lead chromate is the principal oxidizer, barium chromate acts as burning rate modifier, the more of it the slower the reaction) 
 Tungsten Delay Composition: tungsten with barium chromate and potassium perchlorate 
Zirconium Nickel Alloy Delay Composition: zirconium-nickel alloy with barium chromate and potassium perchlorate.
 boron with barium chromate

References

Pyrotechnic compositions
Pyrotechnic initiators